Rutka-Tartak  is a village in Suwałki County, Podlaskie Voivodeship, in north-eastern Poland, close to the border with Lithuania. It is the seat of the gmina (administrative district) called Gmina Rutka-Tartak.

The village has a population of 410.

References

Villages in Suwałki County